Mecynoscaris is a genus of beetles in the family Carabidae, containing the following species:

 Mecynoscaris ambreana Bänninger, 1933
 Mecynoscaris longula (Fairmaire, 1905)

References

Scaritinae